The Huron river chain of lakes consists of an eight-mile (13 km) connection of nine lakes: Big Portage, Little Portage, Baseline, Zukey, Strawberry, Whitewood, Gallagher, Ore, and Tamarack Lake.

Geography

The chain is a watershed of the Huron River and covers northern Washtenaw County and southern Livingston County in Michigan. Big Portage, Little Portage, Base Line, Zukey, Strawberry, Whitewood and Gallagher can all be navigated by normal watercraft, however, Ore and Tamarack are only accessible by small watercraft. The lakes are connected by no-wake canals and are mainly navigated by order of Little Portage, Big Portage, Baseline, Whitewood, Gallagher, Strawberry, and Zukey.

History
During the 18th century French fur traders traveled from Lake Erie to Big Portage by way of the Huron River.

See also
List of lakes in Michigan

References

External links
Huron River Net

Lakes of Michigan
Bodies of water of Washtenaw County, Michigan
Bodies of water of Livingston County, Michigan
Huron River (Michigan)